Guru Nanak Institute of Technology (GNIT) is a private engineering institution established by JIS Group in 2003, located in Panihati, Sodpur, a suburb of Kolkata in the state of West Bengal, India. The college is an AICTE-approved institution  and is affiliated to Maulana Abul Kalam Azad University of Technology, West Bengal. The college in accredited by NAAC with overall institutional CGPA of 2.54

Smart India Hackathon 
Guru Nanak Institute of Technology is a Nodal Centre for the SMART INDIA HACKATHON organized by Govt. of India since 2017.

See also 
 List of institutions of higher education in West Bengal

References

External links
 Official site of Guru Nanak Institute of Technology
 Official Alumni Portal of Guru Nanak Institute of Technology

Educational institutions established in 2003
Colleges affiliated to West Bengal University of Technology
Engineering colleges in Kolkata
Universities and colleges in North 24 Parganas district
2003 establishments in West Bengal